Cecilio Martínez (born 1 February 1943) is a Paraguayan footballer. He played in nine matches for the Paraguay national football team from 1961 to 1963. He was also part of Paraguay's squad for the 1963 South American Championship.

References

External links
 

1943 births
Living people
Paraguayan footballers
Paraguay international footballers
Association football forwards
Sportspeople from Asunción